The Dünamünde Action (Aktion Dünamünde) was an operation launched by the Nazi German occupying force and local collaborationists in Biķernieki forest, near Riga, Latvia. Its objective was to execute Jews who had recently been deported to Latvia from Germany, Austria, Bohemia and Moravia. These murders are sometimes separated into the First Dünamünde Action, occurring on March 15, 1942, and the Second Dünamünde Action on March 26, 1942. About 1,900 people were killed in the first action and 1,840 in the second. The victims were lured to their deaths by a false promise that they would receive easier work at a (non-existent) resettlement facility near a former neighbourhood in Latvia called Daugavgrīva (Dünamünde).  Rather than being transported to a new facility, they were trucked to woods north of Riga, shot, and buried in previously dug mass graves.  The elderly, the sick and children predominated among the victims.

Background

As of February 10, 1942, the approximate ghetto and concentration camp populations of German Jews in Riga and the vicinity were: Jungfernhof concentration camp, 2,500; the German ghetto: 11,000; Salaspils: 1,300.  Of the Latvian Jews, about 3,500 men and 300 women were in the Latvian ghetto. In December 1941, Kurt Krause, whom the author Max Kauffman describes as the "man-eater", became the German commandant of the Riga ghettos. Krause was a former Berlin police detective. His assistant was Max Gymnich, a Gestapo man from Cologne.

Krause and Gymnich used dogs to help enforce their commands. A Latvian Jewish survivor called Joseph Berman, is recorded as stating the following about Gymnich:

Altogether 20,057 Jews from the Reich were deported to Riga. By February 10, 1942, only 15,000 remained alive. Many had been simply murdered upon arrival; how this had occurred was not known to the people arriving on later transport.  According to German ghetto survivor Gertrude Schneider, the inhabitants of the ghetto did not realize how many German Jews had been killed following deportation.  They remained under the impression that deportation and forced labor were the worst things that were going to happen:

The Dünamünde actions 
In March 1942, the Nazi authorities in Riga decided the German ghetto was getting too crowded and organized a massacre which has come to be called the "Dünamünde Action". (The word "action" was a euphemism employed by the Germans to describe mass shootings and later this was picked up by the ghetto inmates themselves.)  The Nazis ordered each of the groups in the German ghetto to prepare a list of between 60 and 120 people for further "resettlement", with the Berlin group required to name 600. The Nazis informed the Judenrat that the people, who were mostly unable to work, being either elderly, infirm, or mothers with young children, would go to a supposed town called Dünamünde to work at fish processing. This was a ruse put together by Obersturmführer Gerhard Maywald. There was no longer a town called Dünamünde, there had not been one for several decades. The ruse succeeded, many people were anxious to go. Despite the Germans only calling for 1,500 to be selected, Sunday March 15, 1942, saw about 1,900 Jews assembled in the streets of the ghetto, including, as with the Rumbula massacre, many parents with small children. There was to be no resettlement of any kind.  Instead the people were taken by motor transport to Biķernieki forest on the north side of Riga, where they were shot and buried in common unmarked graves.

On March 26, 1942, the same ruse was perpetrated at Jungfernhof concentration camp against the older German Jews. The camp commander, Rudolf Seck, refused young people of working age permission to go with their parents. A total of 1,840 people were "resettled" from Jungfernhof that day, again to Biķernieki forest where they were also shot like the 1,900 German Jews from the ghetto 11 days earlier. The method employed had been designed by the infamous mass murderer Friedrich Jeckeln and was called "sardine packing" (German: Sardinenpackung). The historians Richard L. Rubenstein and John K. Roth describe Jeckeln's system:

{{quotation|In the western Ukraine, SS General Friedrich Jeckeln notices that the haphazard arrangement of the corpses meant an inefficient use of burial space. More graves would have to be dug than absolutely necessary. Jeckeln solved the problem. He told a colleague at one of the Ukrainian killing sites, 'Today we'll stack them like sardines.' Jeckeln called his solution Sardinenpackung (sardine packing). When this method was employed, the victims climbed into the grave and lay down on the bottom. Cross fire from above dispatched them. Then another batch of victims was ordered into the grave, positioning themselves on top of the corpses in a head-to-foot configuration. They too were killed by cross-fire from above. The procedure continued until the grave was full."<ref name = Rubenstein_179>Rubenstein and Roth, Approaches to Auschwitz, page 179.</ref>}}

The killers forced the victims to lie face down on the trench floor, or more often, on the bodies of the people who had just been shot. The people were not sprayed with bullets. Rather, to save ammunition, each person was shot just once, in the back of the head. Anyone not killed outright was simply buried alive when the pit was covered up. After the war, when a number of the Einsatzgruppen commanders were placed on trial before the Nuremberg Military Tribunal in the Einsatzgruppen case, the tribunal found that "one defendant did not exclude the possibility that an executee could only seem to be dead because of shock or temporary unconsciousness. In such cases it was inevitable he would be buried alive."

Aftermath

What had happened to the Jews from the ghetto became known when on March 16 and 17, several vans returned to the ghetto carrying the personal property of the people who had been murdered. The clothing bore mudstains and signs of having been hastily removed. For example, stockings were still attached to garters. A detail was assigned to sort and clean these items, many of the items were recognized by name tags and other indicia of ownership.

 Notes 

 References 

 Historiographical 
   Angrick, Andrej, and Klein, Peter, Die "Endlösung" in Riga. Ausbeutung und Vernichtung 1941 - 1944, Darmstadt 2006. 
 Ezergailis, Andrew, The Holocaust in Latvia 1941-1944—The Missing Center, Historical Institute of Latvia (in association with the United States Holocaust Memorial Museum) Riga 1996. 
 Kaufmann, Max, Die Vernichtung des Judens Lettlands (The Destruction of the Jews of Latvia), Munich, 1947, English translation by Laimdota Mazzarins available on-line as Churbn Lettland -- The Destruction of the Jews of Latvia (all references in this article are to page numbers in the on-line edition)
 Rubenstein, Richard L., and Roth, John K., Approaches to Auschwitz, Louisville, Ky. : Westminster John Knox Press, 2003. 
 Schneider, Gertrude, Journey into terror: story of the Riga Ghetto, (2d Ed.) Westport, Conn. : Praeger, 2001. 

 Personal accounts 
 Abstract: Berman, Joseph, "Ascension Commando"; testimony against Max Gymnich'', 1 Dec 1947, provided to the former Association of Baltic Jews, full statement available on line at Weiner Library, Document 057-EA-1222

War crimes trials and evidence 
 Trials of War Criminals before the Nuernberg Military Tribunals under Control Council Law No. 10, Nuernberg, October 1946 - April 1949, Volume IV, ("Green Series) (the "Einsatzgruppen case") also available at Mazel library (well indexed HTML version)

1942 in Latvia
Mass murder in 1942
Einsatzgruppen
Holocaust massacres and pogroms in Latvia
Jungfernhof concentration camp
March 1942 events